Coccoderus is a genus of beetles in the family Cerambycidae, containing the following species:

 Coccoderus amazonicus Bates, 1870
 Coccoderus biguttatus Martins, 1985
 Coccoderus bisignatus Buquet, 1840
 Coccoderus guianensis Tavakilian & Monné, 2002
 Coccoderus longespinicornis Fuchs, 1964
 Coccoderus novempunctatus (Germar, 1824)
 Coccoderus sexmaculatus Buquet, 1840
 Coccoderus sicki Lane, 1949
 Coccoderus speciosus Gounelle, 1909

References

Torneutini